Jesper Jensen (born April 22, 1988) is a Danish professional football midfielder.

External links
National team profile
Career statistics at Danmarks Radio

1988 births
Living people
Danish men's footballers
SønderjyskE Fodbold players
Danish Superliga players
Association football midfielders
Stjarnan players